"Love the One You're With" is a song by American folk rock musician Stephen Stills. It was released as the lead single from his debut self-titled studio album in November 1970. The song, inspired by a remark Stills heard from musician Billy Preston, became his biggest hit single, peaking at No. 14 on the Billboard Hot 100 in early 1971. David Crosby and Graham Nash, Stills' fellow members of Crosby, Stills & Nash, provide background vocals on the song. The song was also recorded by other pop musicians, notably the Isley Brothers, The Meters, Bucks Fizz, Luther Vandross, Bob Seger and Richard Clapton.

Background
Stills wrote the song after being inspired by the tag line — "If you can't be with the one you love, love the one you're with" which was a frequent remark by musician Billy Preston. Stills explained in 1991: "This song has been very good to me. The title came from a party with Billy Preston. I asked him if I could pinch this line he had, and he said, 'Sure.' So I took the phrase and wrote a song around it. It's a good times song, just a bit of fun. My favorite part is the steel drums. I played them before a little bit but I just kept diddling around till I found the right notes."

Cash Box said that Stills' "unique melodic work, the harmonies and a booming  rhythm track make this a bright attraction for top forty as well as FM playlists."

Charts

Weekly charts

Year-end charts

Isley Brothers version

Several acts have since recorded the song, most notably, in 1971, the Isley Brothers, whose unique gospel-driven rendering of the song sent it to the charts again reaching number three R&B and number 18 pop, giving the group their fifth US top 40 pop single. It also reached number 10 US Cash Box.  On the Canadian charts, their version reached No. 41.

Bucks Fizz version

UK pop group Bucks Fizz recorded the song for their eighteenth single in 1986. The single, released in August, was the follow-up to the group's comeback top ten hit "New Beginning (Mamba Seyra)" and was seen as a make or break release. Ultimately the song peaked at a low No.47 in the UK Singles Chart during a three-week run.  In a review, music magazine Number One said that the song lacked bass and sounded rather "tinny" but predicted that it would be a hit. Member Mike Nolan puts the song's failure down to the decision to showcase other male member Bobby G as the lead singer. Their previous single had featured all the group equally and was a hit, while earlier flops had featured G on lead and this was a return to that format. A promotional video for the song was filmed featuring the group performing the song in a blue-toned studio accompanied by backing musicians. The single was released on 7" and 12" on Polydor Records with an extended mix on the latter, the B-side was a Bobby G composition, "Too Hard". Also included on the 12" was an extended mix of earlier single "I Hear Talk". A second 12" single was released featuring a dance edit of "Love the One You're With", backed by another alternate mix of "I Hear Talk".

Chantoozies version

Australian group Chantoozies released a version in February 1991. The song was the second single from the group's second studio album, Gild the Lily. The song peaked at number 21 on the Australian charts.

Charts

Luther Vandross version

American singer Luther Vandross released a version of the song on his ninth album, Songs (1994). It peaked within the top 30 of the US Billboard Hot R&B Singles chart, reached number 33 on the Billboard Hot Adult Contemporary Tracks chart, and earned Vandross a 1995 Grammy nomination for Best Male Pop Vocal Performance.

Critical reception
M.R. Martinez from Cash Box described "Love the One You’re With" as "an optimistic celebration of love and music as Vandross is backed by an all-star choir that includes Lisa Fischer, Tawatha Gee, Jim Gilstrap and others." Fell and Rufer from the Gavin Report wrote, "This 25-year-old Stephen Stills song was urbanized before by the Isley Brothers, but Luther turns it into a gospel hoot complete with the original Hammond organ effects from Stills' take. This is the song that garnered
Vandross a Grammy nomination even before it was released as a single." Pan-European magazine Music & Media commented, "Hailed the King of silky ballads, Luther also knows how to speed it up. In a New Orleans way, and challenged by a gospel group, this [...] cover shows him at his toughest."

Charts

Other notable versions
In 1971, Aretha Franklin included on her Aretha Live at Fillmore West live album.
Gino Soccio reached number 79 in Canada with a 1988 recording of the song.

In culture
In 2012, the song was featured in Ridley Scott's sci-fi movie Prometheus. Idris Elba, playing Janek, sings a short phrase from the song after claiming his squeezebox once belonged to Stephen Stills.

References

External links
 Lyrics of this song

1970 singles
1970 songs
1971 singles
1972 singles
1986 singles
1991 singles
1995 singles
Atlantic Records singles
Bucks Fizz songs
Chantoozies songs
Epic Records singles
The Isley Brothers songs
Luther Vandross songs
Mushroom Records singles
Polydor Records singles
Song recordings produced by Stephen Stills
Song recordings produced by Walter Afanasieff
Songs written by Stephen Stills
Stephen Stills songs
T-Neck Records singles
Will Young songs